Joe's Last Train is an album by the progressive bluegrass band Country Gentlemen, released in 1976.

Critical reception
Country Standard Time wrote that "you hear the expert instrumentalists you expect, but the vocal work provides the anchor ... the harmonies are beautiful."

Track listing

 Joe's Last Train 2:53
 Ages and Ages Ago 2:22
 In My Younger Days 2:25
 Pamela Brown 2:28
 Cryin' Holy 2:12
 This Land Must Die 3:32
 Bloody Mary Morning 2:42
 Goin' Home 2:33
 Texas Chili 1:51
 Free as the Wind 2:36
 Dixieland for Me 2:37
 Lord Don't Leave Me Here 2:20

Personnel
 Charlie Waller - guitar, vocals
 Doyle Lawson - mandolin, vocals
 Bill Holden - banjo, vocals
 Bill Yates - bass, vocals

with
 Mike Auldridge - Dobro
 Ed Ferris - bass, vocals

References

1976 albums
Rebel Records albums
The Country Gentlemen albums